Ghurki (Urdu:  گھرکی ) may refer to:

People with this surname
 Samina Khalid Ghurki (born 1956), Pakistani politician of the Pakistan Peoples Party

Places
 Ghurki, Pakistan, village on the outskirts of Lahore, Punjab, Pakistan